Adrar (Berber: Adrar, ⴰⴷⵔⴰⵔ) is the administrative capital of Adrar Province, the second largest province in Algeria. The commune is sited around an oasis in the Touat region of the Sahara Desert. According to a 2008 census it has a population of 64,781, up from 43,903 in 1998, with an annual growth rate of 4.0%.

Adrar is mainly an agricultural town, characterized by its traditional irrigation system, the Foggara.

Geography

A large oasis lies to the southwest of the town; this oasis lies in the Tuat region, a string of oases running from Bouda in the north to Reggane in the south. A vast area of sand dunes, the Erg Chech, lies to the west, while a large rocky plateau, the Tademaït, lies to the east.

Nuclear testing
Adrar was the site of one of the In Ekker series, French nuclear tests during the 1960s.

Climate

Adrar has a hot desert climate (Köppen climate classification BWh), with long, hot summers and short, warm winters, and averages just  of rainfall per year. Summer temperatures are consistently high as they commonly approach 40 °C (106 °F). temperatures at night are still hot at around 27 °C (81 °F). Even in early May or in late September, daytime temperatures can rise to 45 °C (113 °F). Adrar experiences the same kind of desert heat as Death Valley, California during summertime. Winter nights can be chilly and frost is by no means unknown but the days are pleasantly warm, sunny and dry. During the summer, the Sahara region of Algeria is the source of a scorching, sometimes dusty and southerly wind called the Sirocco.  These winds parch the plateaus of northern Algeria up to 40 days and reach the Tell coastal region for as many as 20 days.

Culture

The settlement in the region (also known as Touat) is quite ancient and the area provides for several different cultures and includes several historic monuments. This intermingling gave birth to a body of traditions and of cultural and hand-crafted practices that are still present today in the life of its inhabitants, translating into a wealth of the folklore and cultural heritage.

Transportation
Touat Cheikh Sidi Mohamed Belkebir Airport (or simply Adrar Airport) is located 10 kilometers away from center of the city.  Airlines include Air Algérie flight to Algiers, Bordj Badji Mokhtar, Oran and Ouargla in addition to Tassili Airlines flights to In Aménas.

Adrar is on the N6 national highway, which leads north to Béchar and south to Reggane and Timiaouine.

Demographics

Education

9.2% of the population has a tertiary education, and another 19.8% has completed secondary education. The overall literacy rate is 84.1%, and is 89.9% among males and 78.1% among females (the second highest among all the communes in the province).

Localities
As of 1984, the commune was composed of the following eight localities:

Adrar
Adgha
Ouguedim
Barbaa
Ouled Oungal
Ouled Ouchen
Ouled Ali
Tililane
Meraguen

References

External links

 Adrar Province

Communes of Adrar Province
Oases of Algeria
Province seats of Algeria
Populated places with year of establishment missing